Yoshinogari may refer to:

 Yoshinogari, Saga, a town in Japan
 Yoshinogari site, a prehistoric site located in Yoshinogari, Saga, Japan